A Dream of Splendor is a 2022 Chinese historical drama television series directed by Yang Yang and starring Liu Yifei, Chen Xiao, Lin Yun and Liu Yan. Set in the Northern Song Dynasty, the series is based on the (Yuan Opera-style) drama Zhao Pan'er Fengyue Jiu Feng Chen《赵盼儿风月救风尘》 by the Yuan Dynasty playwright Guan Hanqing. It is airing on Tencent Video and WeTV from June 2, 2022 to July 24, 2022. Hong Kong's TVB was the first television station to broadcast this drama on TVB Jade from September 5, 2022 to October 14, 2022, previously on its streaming service MyTV SUPER from June 9 to July 2, 2022.  It later went on national broadcast and aired simultaneously on Beijing Satellite Television from 22 November 2022.

Synopsis 
Zhao Pan'er is the owner of a famous tea shop in Qiantang. She supported Ouyang Xu for 3 years before he went to Bianjing to attempt the imperial exam, promising to marry her once he passes. She discovers that though her fiancé won third place in the imperial examination, he plans to wed the daughter of an official and take Zhao Pan'er as a concubine instead of as his main wife.

Unwilling to accept her fate, she decides to go to Bianjing and seek justice. On the way, she meets Gu Qianfan, an upright commander from the Imperial City, and they become entangled in a big case in Jiangnan. Zhao Pan'er rescues Song Yinzhang, who was tricked into marriage and abused, and Sun Sanniang, a chef who was driven to suicide by her callous husband and son, and the three sisters arrive in Bianjing together. 

In order not to be driven away from Bianjing by Ouyang Xu, Zhao Pan'er, Song Yinzhang and Sun Sanniang persevere through many hardships and develop a small teahouse into the largest restaurant in Bianjing, expose the true face of heartless men, and open a door to redemption for countless ordinary women.

Broadcast time

Caste System 

An unusual aspect of this series is that it explicitly addresses and explores the caste system of the Northern Song dynasty. Caste systems existed in China, though they are not as famous or rigid as the ones in India and Edo Period Japan. Broadly speaking, the general citizenry were classed as either "Dastardly" or "Virtuous" based on their profession and ancestry, with a complex system of sub-castes within these two broad classifications. "Dastardly" citizens were restricted in various ways, had fewer civil rights, and were ineligible for imperial examinations and public office. It was not explicitly illegal for women from a "dastardly" background to become the main wife of an official, but it was severely frowned upon and considered to be a mark of poor character.

"Dastardly" professions in this series include merchants, businessmen, and "entertainers", a category which includes the sub-castes of instrument players, singers, dancers, and prostitutes. Scholars have always been highly regarded throughout Chinese history, so of course, they are considered "Virtuous".

Zhao Pan'er's father was a general who violated military orders in order to save citizens from slaughter. As part of his punishment, his family were demoted to "sinners" and Zhao Pan'er was trained as a government-regulated "entertainer". She was later "ransomed/redeemed" by her father's comrades and regained her freedom, but her time as a "sinner" would forever be regarded as a blemish to her reputation if it was ever found out. After being "ransomed/redeemed", Zhao Pan'er opened a tea shop and became a business owner.

Zhao Pan'er's background as a business owner and former sinner was the primary motivation behind Ouyang Xu concealing his relationship with her and later on, reneging on marrying her as his main wife, the inciting incident which sets the story in motion. The Empress was also a former entertainer, and her attempts to protect her identity, and her schemes against those who criticize her for being unworthy of her position, all play key roles in the story.

Song Yinzhang, a talented Pipa player, also struggles with her identity as an "entertainer" of the "dastardly" caste.

Cast

Main Cast

Other Cast

Song

Original Soundtrack

Hong Kong TVB version's Soundtrack

Awards 
 2022 The 13th Macao International Television Festival|The 13th Macao International Television Festival Best Actress in "Golden Lotus": Liu Yifei.

International broadcast

References

External links 
 
 
 

2022 Chinese television series debuts
2022 web series debuts
2022 web series endings
Chinese historical television series
Chinese romance television series
Chinese web series
Mandarin-language television shows
Television series based on plays
Television series by Tencent Penguin Pictures
Tencent original programming